Crni vrh is a mountain in eastern Serbia, between towns of Bor and Žagubica. It is a minor winter resort, and it has several ski tracks, although the infrastructure is in bad shape. However, in 2009 the municipality of Bor invested in reconstruction of the ski lift The main ski track is 1100 m long and has height span of 260 m.

Hotel complex "Hyatt hotel Jelen" is being built  by a consortium of Serbian public companies, however the works were aborted during the NATO bombing and have never been restored. In 2010, talks were held with an unnamed Russian company about overtaking of the site. Currently, there is a mountaineering home near the track, with 30 beds.

Crni vrh has good road infrastructure, because it lies near the magistral road Bor-Žagubica.

At the foothills a dam was built in 1953, creating an artificial lake (Bor Lake). Although it was originally planned to supply the nearby mine, its pure waters proved excellent for swimming for small-scale tourism. On the lake, there is hotel "Jezero" and an auto camp.

Climate
The climate is humid continental (Köppen climate classification: Dfb).

References

Bor, Serbia
Mountains of Serbia